Franz Adam (May 4, 1815 – September 30, 1886) was a German painter, chiefly of military subjects, born and active for much of his life in Italy.

Life
Adam was born in Milan, Italy, to painter Albrecht Adam, a German who had spent the prior several years in Italy. Franz Adam's first notable work was a collection of lithographs on the Revolutions of 1848 in the Italian states, done jointly with noted lithographer Denis Auguste Marie Raffet. He painted his first masterpiece during the Second Italian War of Independence of 1859, a scene from the Battle of Solferino. His best-known works, meanwhile, depict the Franco-Prussian War of 1870.

Of Adam's students, Josef Brandt was the most notable. Adam also taught painting to his nephew, Emil Adam. His brothers Benno and Eugen were also painters.

See also
 List of German painters

References
 

1815 births
1886 deaths
Artists from Milan
19th-century German painters
19th-century German male artists
German male painters
19th-century Italian painters
Italian male painters
Italian battle painters
19th-century war artists
19th-century Italian male artists